An inselberg (or monadnock) is an isolated hill, knob, ridge, outcrop, or small mountain that rises abruptly from a gently sloping or virtually level surrounding plain. The following is a list of notable inselbergs worldwide.

Africa
Cameroon
 Ngog Lituba in the Sanaga-Maritime Department

Côte d'Ivoire (Ivory Coast)
 Mont Niénokoué in Taï National Park

Kenya
 Sergoit Hill

Madagascar
Mont Angavokely
Pic Boby, part of the Andringitra Massif

Malawi
 Mulanje Massif

Mali
 Hand of Fatima

Mozambique
 Mount Chiperone
 Mount Inago
 Mount Mabu
 Mount Namuli
 Serra Jeci
 Serra Mecula
 Mount Lico

Nigeria
 Wase Rock
 Zuma Rock

Tunisia
 Jugurtha Tableland

Zimbabwe
 Castle Beacon in the Bvumba Mountain

Americas
Argentina
Various ignimbrite inselbergs in Sierra de Lihuel Calel, La Pampa Province

Brazil
 Pedra Agulha in Pancas, Espirito Santo

Canada
 Gaff Topsails in Newfoundland
 Mount Sylvester in Newfoundland
 Mount Carleton in New Brunswick
 Mount Cheminis/Mont Chaudron in Ontario/Quebec.
 Mont Mégantic in Quebec near Scotstown

Colombia
 Peñol de Entrerríos,  Antioquia
 Peñol de Guatapé (La Piedra de Peñol), Antioquia
Tabor Mount, Antioquia

Guyana
Makatau Mountain

Mexico
Cerro el Almacén, Bahía de los Ángeles, Baja California Norte

United States
 Mount Monadnock in New Hampshire; the mountain where the term originated
 Alcovy Mountain in Georgia
 Arabia Mountain in Georgia
 Baraboo Range in Wisconsin
 Chief Mountain in Montana
 Crowders Mountain near Kings Mountain, North Carolina
 Devils Tower in Wyoming
 Double Mountain in Texas
 Enchanted Rock in Texas
 Glassy Mountain near Pickens, South Carolina
 Joshua Tree National Park in southern California
 Little Mountain in Newberry County, South Carolina
 Looking Glass Rock in North Carolina
 Monadnock Mountain in northern Vermont
Mount Agamenticus in Maine
 Mount Angel in Oregon
 Mount Ascutney in southern Vermont
 Mount Wachusett in Massachusetts
 Panola Mountain in Georgia
 Paris Mountain near Greenville, South Carolina
 Pilot Mountain in North Carolina
 Rib Mountain in Wisconsin
 Shiprock in New Mexico
 Stone Mountain in Georgia
 Stone Mountain in North Carolina
 Sugarloaf Mountain in Maryland
 Thicketty Mountain in Cherokee County, South Carolina
 Willis Mountain in Virginia

Venezuela
 Piedra del Cocuy

Asia

India
 Meruda Takkar
 Savandurga

Israel
 Mount Tabor

Sri Lanka
 Ritigala
 Sigiriya

Thailand
 Khao Ok Thalu
 Phu Thok

Australia
 Boyagin Rock
 Gill Pinnacle
 Hyden Rock of which Wave Rock is part
 Kokerbin Rock
 Mount Augustus, Western Australia
 Mount Conner (Attila)
 Mount Cooran
 Mount Cooroora
 Mount Cooroy
 Mount Oxley (New South Wales)
 Murphy's Hay Stack 
 Pildappa Rock
 Uluru (Ayers Rock, 863 m) and Kata Tjuta (The Olgas), both within Uluru-Kata Tjuta National Park
 The You Yangs, Victoria

Europe
Finland
Lattunavaara
Naltiotunturi
Pyhätunturi
Sattasvaara
Terävä

Italy
 Rocca di Cavour, Cavour, Piedmont
 Pietra di Bismantova, Castelnovo ne' Monti, Reggio Emilia, Emilia Romagna

Hungary
 Somlóhegy

Norway
 Hårteigen

Portugal
 Monsanto da Beira

Serbia
 Fruška Gora

Sweden
 Blå Jungfrun
 Dundret

United Kingdom
 North Berwick Law in Scotland
 Suilven in Scotland
 The Wrekin in England
 Brent Knoll in England

See also
Bornhardt
Butte
Monolith

References
Twidale, C.R., "A contribution to the general theory of domed inselbergs; conclusions derived from observations in South Australia", Inst. British Geog., Pub., (Tr. & Papers), vol.34, pp.91–113, 1964.  

Inselbergs